Air sovereignty is the fundamental right of a sovereign state to regulate the use of its airspace and enforce its own aviation law – in extremis by the use of fighter aircraft.

The upper limit of national airspace is not defined by international law.

NATO air policing
As part of the principle of collective defence in peacetime, NATO members carry out air policing missions to protect the integrity of Allied airspace. As part of the mission, aircraft are used in a Quick Reaction Air role to respond to both civilian and military aircraft in distress and any aircraft that approach allied airspace and fail to identify themselves, fail to communicate with Air Traffic Control or fail to file a flight plan.

A number of NATO countries cannot sustain a force of quick reaction aircraft, so aircraft of other member states provide cover, such as in the Baltic Area and Icelandic Area. In the Benelux area (Belgium, Luxembourg and the Netherlands), the Belgian and Dutch air forces provide the quick reaction aircraft in turns of four months each.

Switzerland
The Swiss Air Force provides aircraft and systems to protect the sovereignty of Swiss airspace, it also covers Liechtenstein airspace.

United States
The U.S. Supreme Court in 1946 ruled that private property owners have exclusive rights to the airspace above their land, up to an altitude of 365 feet.

In the United States, the air sovereignty mission had been renamed "Air Sovereignty Alert", but in 2011 it was renamed "Aerospace Control Alert." The lion's share of the aerospace control alert missions in the U.S. are carried out by the Air National Guard by units flying, at present time, the F-15 Eagle and F-16 Fighting Falcon jets.

See also
 Flyover rights
 Baltic Air Policing
 Icelandic Air Policing
 Quick Reaction Alert

References

External links
 

 

 

International law
Aviation law
Sovereignty
Aircraft operations